Glendale Cove is an uninhabited  locality that was the site of a cannery owned by Francis Millerd & Co., located on the south side of Knight Inlet in the Central Coast of British Columbia, Canada.  The cannery was located on the east side of the cove.  Somewhere in the vicinity was a village of the Kwakwaka'wakw named Zalidis.

See also
List of canneries in British Columbia

References

Unincorporated settlements in British Columbia
Central Coast of British Columbia
Kwakwaka'wakw
Populated places in the Regional District of Mount Waddington